San Carlos or San Carlos de Tenerife is a Sector in the city of Santo Domingo in the Distrito Nacional of the Dominican Republic. This old neighborhood is populated in particular by individuals from the middle class.

The village of San Carlos de Tenerife was founded in 1684 by Canary Islanders.

San Carlos is home to Club San Carlos of the Torneo Superior de Baloncesto.

External links 
Distrito Nacional sectors

References

Populated places in Santo Domingo
Populated places established in 1684